Love At First Sight is a 1704 comedy play by the writer David Crauford.

It premiered at the Lincoln's Inn Fields Theatre in London. The original cast included Barton Booth as Courtly, George Powell as Lovewell, George Pack as Sir Nicholas Empty, William Fieldhouse as Gripeall, Francis Leigh as Hector, John Freeman as Jeremy, Joe Miller as Watchman, Mary Porter as Fidelia and Lucretia Bradshaw as Celinda.

See also
 Love at first sight

References

Bibliography
 Burling, William J. A Checklist of New Plays and Entertainments on the London Stage, 1700-1737. Fairleigh Dickinson Univ Press, 1992.
 Nicoll, Allardyce. A History of Early Eighteenth Century Drama: 1700-1750. CUP Archive, 1927.

1704 plays
English plays
West End plays
Comedy plays